Raphitoma venusta is an extinct species of sea snail, a marine gastropod mollusc in the family Raphitomidae.

Description

Distribution
Fossils of this extinct marine species were found in Eocene strata on Alabama, USA.

References

 Cossmann (M.), 1893 Notes complémentaires sur la faune éocènique de l'Alabama. Annales de Géologie et de Paléontologie, t. 12, p. 3-5

venusta
Gastropods described in 1833